Florigene is a biotechnology company based in Melbourne, Australia, which is principally involved in the application of in-house genetic modification techniques to develop novel colour expressions in a range of commercial plants.

Florigene has a subsidiary division in the Netherlands and other production operations around the world.

History
Florigene has long been associated with genetic engineering floriculture. Founded as Calgene Pacific Ltd in 1986 with institutional backing from Amcor, CP Ventures Ltd, the Japan-Australia Venture Capital Fund and MPW Rural Development, it was one of Australia's first biotechnology companies.

In 1991, Calgene's research team announced that it had isolated the gene responsible for the expression of the colour blue in petunias, beating out rivals around the globe by a matter of weeks. This breakthrough paved the way for the acquisition of Dutch rival, Florigene, in 1993. Calgene assumed Florigene's corporate name in 1994 to capitalise on that firm's international reputation. Since then, Florigene has developed naturally long-life and disease resistant carnations, new morphologies of gerberas and natural colour modifications of the three main cut flowers - roses, carnations and chrysanthemums, which it exports throughout the Americas, Europe, and Asia.

Public float
Florigene prepared for a public float, hiring Credit Suisse First Boston to develop a prospectus and secure investors across Asia, Europe and the U.S., but was instead acquired by global agrochemicals giant Nufarm Ltd in 1999.

Ownership
In 2003, Japanese brewing giant and long-term partner Suntory acquired 98.5% equity in Florigene from Nufarm.

Developments and potential
The significance of Florigene's technology is the brand potential of its novel flower varieties - a blue rose is a marketer's dream. In 2004, after 20 years and A$45 million worth of exhaustive research and prolific patenting, Florigene and Suntory scientists announced to the world the development of the first rose in the pipeline to a true blue rose. It is expected to be commercialised in the coming years.

See also
 Suntory
 Blue rose

External links
 Florigene corporate website

Biotechnology companies of Australia
Agriculture companies of Australia
Biotechnology companies established in 1986
1986 establishments in Australia
Companies based in Melbourne
Suntory
Science and technology in Melbourne